Dark Knight may refer to:

Batman franchise media

Batman comics
 Dark Knight, a nickname for the superhero Batman
 Batman: The Dark Knight, a monthly comic book series written by David Finch from 2011 to 2014
 Batman: The Dark Knight, a 1986 miniseries by Frank Miller collected in the graphic novel The Dark Knight Returns
 Batman: Legends of the Dark Knight, a monthly comic book series from 1989 to 2007

Batman films
 The Dark Knight Trilogy of Christopher Nolan films:
 Batman Begins, 2005
 The Dark Knight, 2008
 The Dark Knight Rises, 2012
 Batman: DarKnight, an undeveloped Batman film proposed in 1998

Batman music
 The Dark Knight (soundtrack), the soundtrack album to the 2008 film

Batman games
 Batman: The Dark Knight (video game), a cancelled video game based on the 2008 film

Batman attractions
 The Dark Knight Coaster, a roller coaster at several Six Flags parks
 Batman: The Dark Knight (roller coaster), a roller coaster at Six Flags New England

Other uses
 Dark Knight (TV series) or Fantasy Quest, a medieval adventure TV series featuring Todd Rippon
 Black knight, a literary stock character
 "The Dark Knight of Gotham", nickname for Matt Harvey, Major League Baseball pitcher for the New York Mets
 TrES-2b, an extrasolar planet nicknamed "Dark Knight", as it reflects less than 1% of the light that hits it

See also 
 Black Knight (disambiguation)
 
 Dark Night (disambiguation)
 Darkest Night (disambiguation)
 Darkest Knight